Edward Raradza is a Zimbabwean politician and tobacco farmer. He is the former vice-chairperson of the Zimbabwe Farmers Union.

He was elected in the 2008 parliamentary election, as a member of the Zanu-PF for the Muzarabani South constituency; He ran unopposed.

References

Living people
Year of birth missing (living people)
Zimbabwean farmers